Chak Shah Muhammad is a feudal village in Haripur District in Khyber Pakhtunkhwa province of Pakistan. A small farming village of low brick houses, poultry farms and wheat fields, Osama Bin Laden allegedly lived in the village for two and a half years prior to moving to a compound in Abbottabad, Pakistan. It has a population of 1,500.

References

Populated places in Haripur District